Over the history of cinema, some films have been split into multiple parts. This has been done for creative, practical, and financial reasons.  Originally done in the form of low-budget serial films, more recently it has often been done with big-budget feature films.

History

Early examples were serials, which were produced in chapters of 10–30 minutes each, and presented in theaters one each week as a prelude to feature films on the same ticket. With each episode typically ending in a cliffhanger, they encouraged regular attendance at the cinema, and the short running length kept down the cost of each installment, and the number of reels needed to show them.

Later feature films would be produced with a similar strategy in mind, deliberately setting up plot developments to be developed in subsequent features. When the initial film has been highly successful, additional installments may be produced concurrently, taking advantage of economies of scale and the availability of actors and directors to facilitate production. (e.g. The Matrix, Back to the Future)

A common reason for splitting a film has been to accommodate an extended running time; many people would find it uncomfortable to sit for a single three- or four-hour presentation. Some films have addressed this by adopting a practice typical in stage theater: having an intermission at the approximate midpoint of the film, during which members of the audience can stand and walk around, use the restroom if needed, or get a snack or refill their beverage at the concession stand. (e.g. Gandhi, Gods and Generals) Other directors have instead split the film into separate releases. (e.g. Kill Bill)

In the 21st century, it became increasingly common for big-budget films – usually those based on novels which might otherwise have to be substantially condensed, but especially the last in a series – to be released as multiple features. The film adaptation of Harry Potter and the Deathly Hallows was one of the first to do so with the final book in a series, a pattern followed by the Twilight, The Hunger Games, and Divergent series. Peter Jackson's film adaptation of The Hobbit – a final follow-up to his The Lord of the Rings series – was released as three separate features.

Criticism
In many cases, the process of splitting films has been criticized, citing financial motivations in turning successful books into longer film series. The Australian Broadcasting Corporation called it "a recent Hollywood trend of splitting a single book into multiple movies to maximise box office returns from blockbuster franchises". The Hobbit proved particularly controversial because the running time was the result of adding material that was not part of the original book. Studios have countered that one reason for splitting novels from series like Harry Potter and The Hunger Games into multiple films is to appease fans who do not want the film series to end.

Notable examples
 Die Nibelungen were fantasy epics directed by Fritz Lang in 1924. The first half of the film is called Die Nibelungen: Siegfried and the second half of the film is called Die Nibelungen: Kriemhilds Rache (Kriemhild's Revenge).
 Soviet war drama film War and Peace was released in four parts in 1966 and 1967.
 A Touch of Zen, was originally released in two parts in 1970 and 1971 running for a total of 200 minutes. A version combining the two parts was released later in 1971 with a runtime of 180 minutes.
 The Three Musketeers and The Four Musketeers were originally filmed as one film adapting the novel by Alexandre Dumas, but were released as separate films in 1973 and 1974.
Polish historical drama film The Deluge from 1974 was split into two parts, due to its length (over 5 hours).
 Bernardo Bertolucci's 317-minute-long epic historical drama film 1900 (Novecento) was originally presented in two parts upon its European theatrical release (the American release was edited into a single 247-minute version); this presentation was preserved for most of the film's DVD and Blu-ray releases, which present both parts on separate discs.
 In 1987, a nearly six-hour film adaptation of Charles Dickens' novel Little Dorrit was released; it was split into two parts released simultaneously.
 In 1989, The Toxic Avenger Part II and The Toxic Avenger Part III: The Last Temptation of Toxie were produced as one film but later re-edited into two.
 Kill Bill by Quentin Tarantino was originally planned as one film, but was split into two films – Volume 1 and Volume 2, released six months apart in 2003 and 2004 – to avoid cutting it to a shorter length.
 The Japanese epic film trilogy The Human Condition, directed by Masaki Kobayashi and based on the six-volume novel by Junpei Gomikawa, had a run time of almost ten hours as a single film, resulting in the one film being split into three; Volume 1, No Greater Love, was released in 1959, Volume 2, Road to Eternity, also in 1959, and Volume 3, A Soldier's Prayer, in 1961. These were also further split into two parts each for a total of 6 films for the Japanese theatrical release.
 Harry Potter and the Deathly Hallows of the Harry Potter film series was one of the first franchise novels split into multiple parts. Part 1 was released in November 2010 and Part 2 was released in July 2011.
In 2010, Bollywood film Rakta Charitra was released as two films back-to-back months apart.
 In 2012, Bollywood films Gangs of Wasseypur – Part 1 and Gangs of Wasseypur – Part 2 were originally shot as a single film measuring a total of 319 minutes, but since no Indian cinema would screen a film of that length, it was divided into two parts (160 mins and 159 minutes) for the Indian market.
 Breaking Dawn of the Twilight film series was split into two parts. Part 1 was released in November 2011 and Part 2 in November 2012.
 Batman: The Dark Knight Returns is a two-part animated adaptation of Frank Miller's graphic novel of the same name. The first part was released in 2012, and the second in 2013. A Deluxe Edition combining both parts into an unabridged film was released in late 2013.
 Nymphomaniac was originally supposed to be only one complete entry; but, because of its four-hour length, Lars von Trier made the decision to split the project into two separate films.
 The Hobbit is a three-part adaptation of J. R. R. Tolkien's novel The Hobbit. As director Peter Jackson developed the script, the additional material added from Tolkien's notes and The Lord of the Rings Appendices required splitting the single planned film into two parts, and later, into three. An Unexpected Journey, The Desolation of Smaug, and The Battle of the Five Armies were released at one-year intervals beginning in December 2012.
 The film adaptation of The Hunger Games novel Mockingjay is split into two parts with Part 1 released in November 2014 and Part 2 in November 2015.
 Attack on Titan, a live-action film adaptation of the manga series, was split into two parts, both released a month apart in 2015.
 The film adaption of the third Divergent novel Allegiant was set to be split into two parts: Allegiant released in March 2016 and Ascendant was set to be released on June 9, 2017. Due to Allegiants poor box office performance, Ascendant was eventually cancelled.
 The film adaptation of Stephen King's novel It is split into two parts with Chapter One released in September 2017 and Chapter Two in September 2019.
An anime film adaptation of Haikara-San: Here Comes Miss Modern was split into two parts with Part 1 released in 2017, and Part 2 in 2018.
Code Geass Lelouch of the Rebellion, an anime compilation film of the anime television series of the same name was split into three parts: Initiation was released on October 21, 2017, Transgression was released on February 10, 2018, and Glorification was released on May 26, 2018.
Blood-Club Dolls, a live-action film of Blood-C anime series was split into two parts: 1 was released on October 13, 2018, and 2 was released on July 11, 2020.
 Avengers: Endgame is a direct continuation of Infinity War and was subtitled Infinity War – Part 2 at one point in its development. Infinity War was released on April 27, 2018 and Endgame a year later on April 26, 2019.
 The biography of N. T. Rama Rao was originally supposed to be a single film but because of its length, it was split into the films NTR: Kathanayakudu and NTR: Mahanayakudu. Both were released one month apart in January and February 2019.
Sailor Moon Eternal is a two-part anime film that is a direct continuation (and a "fourth season") for the Sailor Moon Crystal anime series. Both were released in January and February 2021.
Sailor Moon Cosmos, a sequel to Sailor Moon Eternal (and a "fifth and final season" for Sailor Moon Crystal) will also be presented in two parts, with both films releasing in Summer 2023.
The 2021 film Dune is an adaptation of Frank Herbert's 1965 science-fiction novel. However, it is marketed as Dune: Part One as it only adapts the first half of Herbert's novel. A sequel called Dune: Part Two is due to release in November 2023. This will adapt the second half of Herbert's novel.
The sequel to Spider-Man: Into the Spider-Verse was split into two parts as Spider-Man: Across the Spider-Verse with Part One releasing on October 7, 2022 and Part Two releasing a year later in 2023. Part One was later removed from the title of the first, while the second was renamed to Spider-Man: Beyond the Spider-Verse.
The film adaptation of the Broadway musical Wicked is being split into two parts with release dates set for Christmas 2024 and 2025.

See also
Back-to-back film production
List of films produced back-to-back
Split television season

References

Multiple